Thomas Corcoran may refer to:

Thomas Corcoran (footballer) (1909–?), English professional footballer
Tommy Corcoran (1869–1960), baseball player
Tom Corcoran (writer) (1943–2023), American writer of mystery novels
Tom Corcoran (skier) (1931–2017), American alpine skier
Tom Corcoran (politician) (born 1939), American politician
Thomas E. Corcoran (1839–1904), U.S. Navy sailor and Medal of Honor recipient
Thomas Gardiner Corcoran (1900–1981), American lawyer and political figure; advisor to Franklin D. Roosevelt
Thomas Corcoran (mayor) (1754–1830), mayor of Georgetown, District of Columbia, U.S.